The Freezer is the name of the CPU coolers from Arctic, which has been the company's staple product for many years. To most enthusiasts, Arctic is best known for their Freezer line of CPU coolers as well as their thermal compound called MX-2 and MX-4. The Freezer line of coolers is available in different fan speed, cooling capacity and motherboard compatibility to cater the needs of different type of users from HTPC users to enthusiasts and overclockers.
The Freezer series CPU coolers are designed to lower the temperature inside your computer to enhance the stability and lifespan of the processor.

Products

Low-profile
 Freezer 7 LP
 Freezer 11 LP
 Freezer 64 LP

Mid-range
 Freezer 7
 Freezer 64
 Freezer 7 PRO Rev. 2
 Freezer 64 PRO
 Freezer XTREME Rev.2
 Freezer 13

Enthusiast-grade
 Freezer i30
 Freezer A30
 Freezer 13 PRO
 Freezer 13 PRO CO
 Freezer 13 CO

See also
 Intel
 AMD

References

External links
 Arctic official website

Computer hardware cooling